Button is a Soviet animated film directed by Vladimir Tarasov and released by the Soyuzmultfilm studio in 1982. It is based on a short story by Herbert G. Wells.

Plot
Dissatisfied with a torn shirt button, an artist redraws a self-portrait with the button in place. He then goes on and changes the portrait into a young man in an expensive suit against the backdrop of a new car and a country house. Wanting to show off the result, he shows the portrait to his girlfriend. The painted handsome man comes to life and begins to aggressively flirt with the girl. The confused artist has great difficulty dealing with his opponent.

External links
 
 
 Information about the film Button on animator.ru 
 
 

1982 films
Russian and Soviet animated science fiction films
Films by Vladimir Tarasov
Soviet animated films
Soyuzmultfilm
Russian animated short films